Jörg Arthur Freyhof (born 4 November 1964 in Ludwigshafen) is a German ichthyologist specializing on Old World cypriniform fishes.
Freyhof has worked at the Alexander Koenig Research Museum, Bonn, and since 2000 he has been employed at the Leibniz Institute of Freshwater Ecology and Inland Fisheries, Berlin.

Bibliography
Maurice Kottelat & Jörg Freyhof (2007) Handbook of European Freshwater Fishes Published by the authors. .
Jörg Freyhof & Emma Brooks (2011) European Red List of Freshwater Fishes Luxembourg: Publications Office of the European Union.

See also
:Category:Taxa named by Jörg Freyhof

References

Living people
1964 births
German ichthyologists